City-Air was an airline based in Germany. Founded in the 1970s as TAG City-Air, it had operated a fleet of Metroliners, Saab 340s and an ATR 42-500 on domestic routes within Germany and on several international routes to Austria, Denmark, Hungary and Switzerland. It suspended operations in February 2004 and filed for insolvency.

References

External links
City-Air

Defunct airlines of Germany
Airlines established in 2000
Airlines disestablished in 2004
German companies disestablished in 2004
German companies established in 2000